Mapou is a village in northern Mauritius, located in Rivière du Rempart District. The village is administered by the Mapou Village Council under the aegis of the Rivière du Rempart District  Council. According to the census made by Statistics Mauritius in 2011, the population was 1,275.

Places of interest
The village is mostly known for being home to The Château de Labourdonnais, a colonial house dating from 1859 and which sits on a property dating from  1777. The house has been converted to a museum about colonial life in the island of Mauritius and a restaurant. Other facilities on the domain include the gardens and orchards and the "Rhumerie des Mascareignes" Rum distillery which produces the "La Bourdonnais" and "Rhumeur" brands of rum. Fruits from the orchard are used to produce the "Labourdonnais" range of products such as jellies, jams and fruit juice.

Education

 Northfields International High School is situated in Mapou.

See also 
 List of places in Mauritius

References 

Populated places in Mauritius
Rivière du Rempart District